Hijab – Mulheres de véu (Hijab – Veiled Women) is a 2013 Brazilian documentary film directed by Paulo Halm.

Synopsis 
Patricia, Zahreen, Jamile, Maria, Jamila and Marcela are carioca women who adopted Islam as a religion and began to wear the hijab, a traditional veil that covers the hair of Muslim women. The film dialogues with these women and shows the consequences of this religious option in their relationship with their families, at school and work.

References

Brazilian documentary films
Documentary films about women and religion
Documentary films about Islam
Hijab
Islam in Brazil
2013 in Islam